The Surrey City Centre Library is the main branch of Surrey Libraries (Surrey, British Columbia's public library system). It was opened in September 2011 and replaced the Whalley Public Library.  Part of a re-vitalization project for the City Centre area, the building was designed by the late Bing Thom. The library is located northwest of Surrey Central station in the Whalley / City Centre neighbourhood.

Planning and construction

Part of a long-term re-vitalization effort by the City of Surrey, dubbed "Build Surrey", the City Centre branch library project was launched in 2009. It replaced the Whalley Public Library.  The library is part of a new complex of buildings still under construction, including the City Centre shopping and education complex, a performing arts centre, and a new City Hall. The design was awarded to Bing Thom Architects, who had designed the nearby City Centre complex as well as Vancouver-area buildings such as the University of British Columbia's Chan Centre.  The total budget was set at $36 million; the provincial and federal governments each contributed $10 million with the remainder supplied by the city. It is LEED Gold certified.

Faced with a short public consultation period, the architects used social media to gain input from the community.  Through Facebook, Twitter, and a blog, respondents compiled an "ideasbook" of desired elements. Construction finished in the summer of 2011, and the branch was opened to the public in September of that year.

Facilities
The library has  of usable space spread over four floors. Its 100,000-item collection of print materials is modest for a large urban library; the library is focused on community services such as language programs for Surrey's large immigrant population, youth and adult programs, and computer access. The library features non-traditional facilities like a cafe, an iPad station for children, a meditation room (which also serves as a prayer room), and bookable study room spaces.

Appearance in media
Surrey Central Library appears in the following media:
 City-building computer game Cities: Skylines as a "Grand Library"
 TV series Continuum: Season 4, Episode 5 as a "Piron Labs"
 Supergirl: Season 2, Episode 6 as "National City Art Gallery"
 TV series Travelers: Season 1, Episode 1
 Everything, Everything as a library

References

External links
Surrey Libraries website, City Centre Library

Library buildings completed in 2011
Buildings and structures in Surrey, British Columbia
Public libraries in British Columbia
Libraries established in 2011
2011 establishments in Canada